Pelinia is a commune in Drochia District, Moldova. It is composed of two villages, Pelinia and Pelinia, loc. st.c.f. (Pelinia station). At the 2004 census, the commune had 7,538 inhabitants. 
Pelinia is the largest commune in Moldova.

Media 
 Vocea Basarabiei 101,0

References

Communes of Drochia District